Yang Guoqiang (born October 9, 1954, in Shunde, Guangdong), is a Chinese entrepreneur, the founder and chairman of Country Garden Group, one of the largest real estate developers in Guangdong Province, Mainland China.

The Country Garden Group was listed in the Hong Kong Stock Exchange in April 2007.

References

1954 births
People from Foshan
Businesspeople from Guangdong
Billionaires from Guangdong
Living people
Chinese real estate businesspeople
Chinese company founders